Colombian Australians are Australian citizens who trace their nationality or heritage from the South American nation of Colombia.

Causes of migration
Economic problems and violence led to an emigration of Colombians to Australia in the 1980s. Colombians are one of the largest South American migrant groups to Australia. Like other South American immigrants and unlike Central American and Caribbean Hispanic immigrants, Colombians tend to come from urban areas.

Ethnic composition of Colombians in Australia

Ethnically, Colombians are a diverse population including Colombians of Indigenous descent, Afro-Colombians, Colombians of European descent (mainly Spanish ancestry). However, most Colombians are mix of the three ethnicities.

Cultural traditions
The main musical interests are vallenato, salsa and cumbia, Mi hermano y yo Vallenato y Folclore is a traditional folk band that aims to share and preserve these interests in Australia.  The vast majority of Colombians are Roman Catholic; younger Colombians are significantly more secular than the older generation.
Colombian food is highly varied. Popular dishes are bandeja paisa, sancocho (stew), empanadas (meat-filled turnovers), pandebono (a type of cheese-bread), and arepa (corncake). Like most immigrants raised in Australia some children will seek Australian sports. Another popular pastime, especially among the older generation, is parqu�s.

Notable people
Adam Garcia, actor
María Fernanda Cardoso, artist
Gustavo Giron Marulanda, footballer

See also

 African Australians
 Afro-Colombians
 Colombian diaspora
 European Australians
 Europeans in Oceania
 Hispanic and Latin American Australians
 Immigration to Australia

References

Australian
 
Latin American Australian